Nils Rosén may refer to:
Nils Rosén von Rosenstein, professor of medicine at Uppsala University
Nils von Rosenstein, son of the previous, first secretary of the Swedish Academy
Nils Rosén (footballer), member of the Swedish team at the 1934 FIFA World Cup
Nils Rosén (zoologist), Swedish zoologist